The Diocese of Down and Dromore (also known as the United Dioceses of Down and Dromore) is a diocese of the Church of Ireland in the south east of Northern Ireland. It is in the ecclesiastical province of Armagh. The geographical remit of the diocese covers half of the City of Belfast to the east of the River Lagan and the part of County Armagh east of the River Bann and all of County Down.

Overview and history

When the Church in England broke communion with the Roman Catholic Church, the Church of England was established by the state as the established church. Later, by decree of the Irish Parliament, a similar new body became the State Church in the Kingdom of Ireland. The English-speaking minority mostly adhered to the Church of Ireland or to Presbyterianism. On the death of Archbishop Trench of Tuam in 1839, the Province of Tuam was united to the Armagh. Over the centuries, numerous dioceses were merged, in view of declining membership. Until 1944, the dioceses of Down and Dromore were part of the United Dioceses of Down, Connor and Dromore. In 1944, the Diocese of Connor gained a separate existence under its own bishop. It is for this reason that the united diocese has three cathedrals.

Cathedrals

 Holy Trinity Cathedral, Downpatrick
 Cathedral of Christ the Redeemer, Dromore.
 St Anne's Cathedral, Belfast (Shared with the Diocese of Connor)

The Diocese is the second largest of the Church of Ireland in terms of church population, with around 91,000 people and more than one hundred serving ordained Clergy. It is divided up into 79 parishes, with a total of 115 churches.

Bishops
Although the united diocese works under a single bishop, currently David McClay, each of the two dioceses within it has its own set of officers.

Bishops of Down and Connor

 John Charden (1596–1601)
 Henry Leslie (1635–1661)
 Jeremy Taylor (1661–1667)
 Roger Boyle (1667–1672)
 John Ryder (1743–1752)
 Richard Mant (1823–1842)

Bishops of Down, Connor and Dromore

 Richard Mant (1842–1848)
 Robert Bent Knox (1849–1886)
 William Reeves (1886–1892)
 John Baptist Crozier (1907–1911)
 Charles Frederick D'Arcy (1911–1919)
 Charles T. P. Grierson (1919–1934)
 Charles King Irwin (1942–1944)

Bishops of Down and Dromore

 William Shaw Kerr (1945–1955)
 Frederick Julian Mitchell (1955–1969)
 George Alderson Quin (1970–1980)
 Robert "Robin" Eames (1980–1986)
 Harold Creeth Miller (1997–2019)
 David Alexander McClay (2020–present)

Relation with the Anglican realignment
Former Bishop Harold Miller is a member of GAFCON Ireland, and he attended GAFCON III, held in Jerusalem, on 17–22 June 2018. His successor, David McClay, is also a leading member of GAFCON Ireland.

See also
 List of Anglican dioceses in the United Kingdom and Ireland
 Roman Catholic Diocese of Down and Connor
 Roman Catholic Diocese of Dromore

References

External links
Diocesan homepage

 
Derry and Raphoe
Religion in County Down
Religion in County Armagh
Anglican realignment dioceses